The Swedish slave trade mainly occurred in the early history of Sweden when the trade of thralls (Old Norse: þræll) was one of the pillars of the Norse economy. During the raids, the Vikings often captured and enslaved militarily weaker peoples they encountered, but took the most slaves in raids of the British Isles, and Slavs in Eastern Europe. This practice lasted from the 6th through 11th centuries until formally abolished in 1335.
A smaller trade of African slaves happened during the 17th and 18th centuries, around the time Swedish overseas colonies were established in North America (1638) and in Africa (1650). It remained legal until 1813.

The slaves from Western Europe were mainly Franks, Anglo-Saxons, and Celts. Many Irish slaves were used in expeditions for the colonization of Iceland. The Norse also took Baltic, Slavic and Latin slaves.
The Vikings kept some slaves as servants and sold most captives in the Byzantine or Islamic markets. Vikings navigated the "Highway of the Slaves" through the Aegean Sea and into Black Sea ports first established by Archaic Greeks, shoreline crossroads for human trafficking. The slave trade was one of the pillars of the Norse economy during the 6th through 11th centuries. The Persian traveler Ibn Rustah described how Swedish Vikings, the Varangians or Rus, terrorized and enslaved the Slavs taken in their raids along the Volga River.

Thralldom was outlawed in 1335 by Magnus IV of Sweden for thralls "born by Christian parents" in Västergötland and Värend, being the last parts where it had remained legal. This however, was only applicable within the borders of Sweden, which opened up for later slave trade in the colonies.

In the 17th century, Swedish slave traders started to become involved with the Atlantic slave trade. Between 1784 and 1878, Sweden maintained possession of a handful of colonies in the Caribbean. The Swedish colony of Saint Barthélemy functioned as a duty-free port and became a major destination center for slave ships. Slaves were brought in tax free by foreign vessels and the Swedish Crown made a profit by collecting an export tax when slaves were shipped out. Sweden was also a major supplier of iron for chains used in the slave trade. In the early 19th century, Sweden signed treaties with the United Kingdom and France to abolish the slave trade.

In 1847, slavery was abolished in all parts of Sweden, including her colonies, on the basis of a decision taken in 1846. Slavery was legislated in Saint-Barthélemy under the Ordinance concerning the Police of Slaves and free Coloured People dated 30 July 1787, original in French dated 30 June 1787. The last legally owned slaves in the Swedish colony of Saint-Barthélemy were bought and freed by the Swedish state on October 9, 1847.

Slaves in Sweden the Migration period 
	
	
	
Early Swedish history is clouded in mystery and the sources are therefore subjected to much scrutiny and especially the trustworthiness of the Icelandic sagas is in doubt. Because the Swedish monarchs mentioned by foreign sources do not correlate with the monarchs mentioned by Icelandic Sagas. The Swedish king Ongentheow sometimes in Beowulf saga named Angan-Tys which seems to be another version of the name Týs öttungr another word for Eadgils for the same Swedish king Eadgils mentioned in Ynglinga Saga. 500 AD however is mentioned in the Anglo-Saxon poem Widsith describing other known historical Germanic rulers from 500 AD.
	
According to the Icelandic sagas a slave revolt led by the slave Tunne lead to the Swedish king Eadgils getting deposed and forced to flee to the Danes (Germanic tribe). Tunne was the slave responsible for the guard of the royal treasury and weaponry. The Swedish Weaponry was guarded by a slave as mentioned by the Roman historian Tacitus. Later according to the saga crowning himself king of Svitjod. The Swedes probably took the weapons from the royal weaponry forcing the royals and nobles to unbury their ancestors swords and helmets buried close to Gamla Uppsala to fight  the slaves and Tunne used the weapons from the royal weaponry to defeat the Swedish army in several battles. The mounds from 500 AD lack weapons in archaeological examinations supporting the story that the slaves or royals took weapons from the grave tumulus to support their rebellion. Later with the help of Danish soldiers, the slave uprising was crushed.  Tunne most likely came from the Northlands as the name Tunne is only found on Runestones in the Swedish Northlands.

Slaves in the Medieval period in Sweden 

Slavery was common in the Viking age period and one of the main reasons for the Viking expansion was the search for slaves in other countries. One of the reasons Kievan Rus came to be was that Scandinavian settlers established themselves and traded with captured slaves. Thralls could have some social mobility in Norse society as Olav Tyggvason for example, went from captured slave to king of Norway.

Arabic and Byzantine merchants bought the goods, and their Swedish traders and warriors were known as Varangians. One of the only accounts describing Norse slave practices in detail and first person is the Arabic merchant Ibn Fadlan meeting Volga Vikings. Describing Swedish Vikings using the Volga trade route using Saqaliba or Slavic slaves as translators when trading. 
There he describes the Norse ship burials only known in Norse society before the Viking expansion in 800 AD into Russia and Ukraine and that a slave girl was sacrificed to follow her master. Norse burials found in Sweden and Norway indicate that slaves were sacrificed in Sweden to follow their masters to the afterlife. However Swedish archaeology shows that mostly male slaves were killed to follow their master into the afterlife and not females. Even thou sacrificed female slaves also have been found sacrificed similarly in Norway. There a young girl of Iranian descent found in the grave showed signs of having her throat slit. In a similar manner to the execution described by Ibn Fadlan.    Erik Anundsson a Swedish kings is also described as sacrificing his wife to the norse gods. 
  
Tasks for slaves in Sweden were helping with agricultural output for males and serving as concubines for women. The establishment of Kievan Rus likely decreased the number of slaves taken in raids creating a more local market for slaves in Sweden. Christianity changed the view of slavery to anathema to a civilized society. Giving freedom to a slave was seen as a holy act giving the nobleman more of a chance to reach heaven. While poorer farmers probably did not have the financial option as free noblemen had. This probably means that farmers or freemen were the last to free their slaves

Trading Stations in Africa 
In 1650, Sweden established trading stations along the West African coast, with bases in an area called the Swedish Gold Coast which was later a part of the West African Gold Coast, and which is today part of Ghana. Sweden and Denmark were competing for positions as regional powers during this period, and the Danes followed the Swedes to Africa, setting up stations a couple of years later. In 1663, the Swedish Gold Coast was taken over by the Danish colonial power and became part of the Danish Gold Coast. There is no historical documentation that shows that slaves were ever traded in the trading stations during their 13-year Swedish possession.

Swedish trading stations reappeared in the 18th century, when Sweden established a colonial presence in the Caribbean.

Slavery in the Barbary Coast
There were over 1500 Swedish slaves in the Barbary Coast. Many would never see their homeland again.  The Turks also frequently castrated their slaves. The Ottomans also bought black sex slaves from the Swedes.

Sweden together with, the United States of America and Kingdom of Sicily, would intervene in 1801 to free Swedish, American and Sicilian slaves from the Barbary Coast. In the First Barbary War three Swedish ship would partake to free Swedish slaves.

Slave trade under King Gustav III 

In 1771, Gustav III became the King of Sweden. He wanted Sweden to re-establish itself as a European "Great Power". Overseas colonies were a symbol of power and prestige at that time, so he decided to acquire colonies for Sweden. Denmark received large revenues from its colonies in the West Indies, so in 1784, Gustav acquired the West Indian island of Saint-Barthélemy from France.

On August 23, 1784, the king informed the Privy Council that Sweden now owned an island in the West Indies. This apparently came as a surprise for many of the Councilors. The first report concerning the island came from Simon Bérard, Swedish consul-general in L'Orient, the only town. He reported that:

It (Saint-Barthélemy) is a very insignificant island, without strategic position. It is very poor and dry, with a very small population. Only salt and cotton is produced there. A large part of the island is made up of sterile rocks. The island has no sweet water; all the wells on the island give only brackish water. Water has to be imported from neighbouring islands. There are no roads anywhere.

According to Bérard, there was no possibility of agriculture because of the poor soil. The island's one desirable feature was a good harbor.

Bérard recommended that the island be made a free port. At that time, France had trouble providing sufficient slaves to its colonies in the area. Sweden could try to export a certain number of slaves to the French colonies in the region each year.

If Saint-Barthélemy was a success, Sweden could later expand its colonial empire to more islands in the area.  Gustav also knew that the leading slave trading nations in Europe made large amounts of money from it.

In the autumn of 1786, the Swedish West India Company was established on the island. Gustav told investors that they could expect big profits in the future. Anyone who could afford it was allowed to buy shares, but Gustav kept 10 per cent of the shares for himself, which made him the largest shareholder. The king received one-quarter of all profits of the company and the other shareholders three quarters, even though the king owned only 10 per cent of the company.

On October 31 of the same year, a privilege letter was made for the West India Company. The company was granted the right to trade slaves between Africa and the West Indies. Paragraph 14 in the letter states: "The Company is free to operate slave trade in Angola and the African coast, where such is permitted."

On March 12, 1790, a new custom tax and constitution were introduced to the island. Both were designed to make Saint-Barthélemy into a haven for slave traders. The new laws gave astonishing opportunities for traders from all over the world.

There was no duty on slaves imported from Africa to Saint-Barthélemy: Free import of slaves and trade with black slaves or so called new Negroes from Africa is granted to all nations without having to pay any charge at the unload.

People from all over the Caribbean came to buy slaves. The government charged a small export duty on slaves sold from Saint-Barthélemy to other colonies. This duty was halved for slaves imported from Africa on Swedish ships, generating increased profits for the West India Company and other Swedish traders.

The new constitution stated: Freedom for all on Saint Bartholomew living and arriving to arm and send out ships and shipments to Africa to buy slaves on the places thus is permitted for all nations. That way a new branch for the Swedish trade in Africa and the Coast of Guinea should arise.

In 1813, Sweden was awarded control of Guadeloupe, a nearby French colony temporarily under British occupation. In 1814, though, with the fall of Napoleon, Sweden gave the island back to France.

One of the first African slave in Sweden were Gustav Badin. He was taken from his parents at a young age and sold into slavery. Later Danish slave traders would bring him as a gift to the Swedish queen. They trained Badin as a test to see if the Noble savage was true or if the black man lacked the qualities the white man possessed. Many doubted a black man could learn to become as educated as a white man in Sweden. But Badin indeed managed to learn plenty of things disproving the idea that Black men were savages and unable to become educated. Later Badin married and became a famous and liked person in the royal court. Badin did act more freely than other kids for the time. But that was mainly due to his unusual liberal childhood. The queen gave him freedom from Corporal punishment in the home which, was customary for young royals and nobles during childhood. He also later also, learned about the Swedish Lutheran religion and married Elisabeth Svart.

Abolition 
In 1788, the British Committee for the Abolition of Slavery sent a Swedish opponent of the slave trade, Anders Sparrman, to Gustav III. The committee feared that other nations would expand their trade if Britain stopped its own. They sent books about the issue and a letter, in which the king was encouraged to hinder his subjects to participate in this disgraceful trade. In the response letter, delivered through Sparrman, he wrote that no one in the country had participated in the slave trade and that he would do all that he could to keep them from doing so.

During the early 19th century, movements against slavery became stronger, especially in Britain. Slave trade was outlawed in Britain in 1807, and in the United States in 1808, after which other countries started to follow suit. Sweden made the slave trade illegal as part of the Treaty of Stockholm with Britain in 1813, but allowed slavery until October 9, 1847.

During the 19th century, the British Admiralty patrolled the African coast to catch illegal slave traders. The Swedish vessel Diana was intercepted by the British authorities close to the coast of Africa while engaged in carrying slaves from Africa to Saint Bartholomew during this period. The case was taken to court in order to test if the slave trade could be considered contrary to the general law of nations. However, the vessel was returned to the Swedish owners on the ground that Sweden had not prohibited the trade and tolerated it in practice.

Once the slave trade became a hot issue, the Swedish government abandoned the slave trade in the Caribbean, but did not initially outlaw slavery. The West Indian colonies became financial burdens. The island of Guadeloupe was returned to France in 1814, in return for a compensation in the sum of 24 million francs. A Guadeloupe Fund was established in Sweden for the benefit of the Swedish Crown Prince and Regent Charles XIV John of Sweden, born Jean-Baptiste Bernadotte, a French national and former Marshal of France under Napoleon I. He and his heirs were paid 300,000 riksdaler per year up until 1983 in compensation for their loss of prestige in France when Sweden joined Britain against France in the Napoleonic War. In Saint Bartholomew, the Swedish government bought the remaining slaves to give them freedom. According to Herman Lindqvist in Aftonbladet (8 October 2006), 523 slaves were bought free for 80 riksdaler per slave.

Exactly how many slaves were brought to the New World on Swedish ships is yet impossible to know, since most of the archives documents have not been investigated seriously in that respect, and many of them are by now not accessible because of their bad preservation and non microfilming. Nevertheless, some data, mostly concerning the former Swedish island Saint-Barthélemy, is now available online.

Further reading
 Göran Skytte Det kungliga svenska slaveriet (The Royal Swedish Slave Trade)  Stockholm : Askelin & Hägglund, 1986  157 pp.(Swedish)
 Jan-Öjvind Swahn, Ola Jennersten Swahn, Saint-Barthélemy: Sveriges sista koloni (Saint-Barthélemy : Sweden's Last Colony)    Höganäs : Wiken, 1985 155 pp. (Swedish)
 Per Tingbrand Vem var vem på Saint-Barthélemy under den svenska tiden? (Who was who in Saint-Barthélemy During the Swedish Epoch?) S:t Barthélemy-sällskapet (pub) (The St. Barthélemy Society (pub). (Swedish)
 Ben Raffield (2019) "The slave markets of the Viking world: comparative perspectives on an ‘invisible archaeology’." Slavery & Abolition, 40:4, 682-705
Thomas K. Heebøll-Holm (2020) "Piratical slave-raiding – the demise of a Viking practice in high medieval Denmark," Scandinavian Journal of History

See also 
 Swedish overseas colonies
 Saint-Barthélemy
 Slavery
 Thrall
 Triangle trade
 Slave Trade Act 1807

References

External links
 Mémoire St Barth | History of St Barthélemy (archives & history of slavery, slave trade and their abolition), Comité de Liaison et d'Application des Sources Historiques.
 McAlinden, Tom (2007). Sweden’s slave trade. Network Europe, Radio Broadcast, 30 March 2007.

Former Swedish colonies
18th century in Sweden
Economic history of Sweden
Political history of Sweden
Sweden
African slave trade
17th century in Sweden